C. K. Tamilarasan is an Indian politician and was a member of the Tamil Nadu Legislative Assembly from the K. V. Kuppam constituency. He represented the Republican Party of India party. He was made the Interim Speaker in the floor of Fourteenth Assembly.

The elections of 2016 resulted in his constituency being won by G. Loganathan.

References 

Living people
Tamil Nadu politicians
Tamil Nadu MLAs 2011–2016
Republican Party of India politicians
Year of birth missing (living people)
Tamil Nadu MLAs 1991–1996